The Fahai Temple is Ming Dynasty Buddhist temple located at the foot of Cuiwei Mountain, about two kilometers to the north-east of Moshikou, Shijingshan District, Beijing, China. It was declared as a national cultural relic protection unit in 1988. It is located within Fahai Temple Forest Park.

History
Construction of the Fahai Temple started in 1439 during the Ming dynasty and was completed in 1443.

Frescoes
The most distinguishing part of Fahai Temple is the Ming dynasty frescoes. The total area of the frescoes is 236.7 square meters. Comparing with other famous frescoes in China, such as the Yongle Palace frescoes and the Dunhuang frescoes, Fahai Temple's well-preserved frescoes are also notable in the depiction of figures, subtlety of patterns and the craft methods.

Cultural relics
 Bronze Bell

Major National Historical and Cultural Sites in Beijing
Buddhist temples in Beijing
Arts in China